Thriving Ivory was an American rock band based in the San Francisco Bay area. They released their self-titled Wind-up Records debut album on June 24, 2008. The debut album reached number 1 on the Billboard Heatseekers chart on the strength of the charting single "Angels on the Moon". After half a year, "Angels on the Moon" appeared on the US Pop 100 Chart, reaching number 28. Several songs off of the record were recorded with award-winning producer Howard Benson.

The band was featured as a VH1 You Oughta Know Artist and won the Yahoo! Music: Who's Next? User's Choice Competition. In 2009 they performed their single "Angels on the Moon" on Jimmy Kimmel Live! and The Rachael Ray Show. Early in 2010 their first single "Angels on The Moon" went certified Gold in the US selling over 500,000 copies.
Their second studio album, Through Yourself & Back Again was released on September 14, 2010. The record was co-produced by Thriving Ivory, Gregg Wattenberg, and Grammy award-winning producer/mixer Mark Endert.

The band took a hiatus from 2010-2016 to explore other opportunities and eventually ended their relationship with Wind Up Records. Original founding guitar player Andrew Cribley began to pursue other musical and creative outlets in the San Francisco Bay Area, while original founding drummer Paul Neidermier took a break from the band to focus on his family and other pursuits. In the summer of 2016 founding members, Scott Jason and Clayton Stroope began working on new material for what would be their first new release since 2010. After announcing this on social media the band was approached by Jeremy Lopez of the management firm Lippman Entertainment; however, shortly thereafter they decided to separate.

Both Scott and Clayton have announced on their social media plans for moving forward but in different directions. Scott Jason subsequently launched a solo project under the name Scott Jason Through A Telescope and has released new songs on all digital platforms.

Scott also volunteers for the 501(c)(3) non-profit Angels on the Moon and plays the occasional show, some of which help raise money for Angels on the Moon.

In the Fall of 2018 Clayton Stroope was signed by the Los Angeles-based publishing firm Riptide Music Group. He has since released an EP under the project name City Wolf, and has had tracks licensed by Amazon Prime, Fox Sports, Hulu, Marvel, Netflix, Activision, TNT, NISSAN, and NBC. He is currently collaborating on new project with licensing music veteran, rapper Easy McCoy, for the Los Angeles-based publishing/licensing firm Position Music. The duo was signed by United Talent Agency in the summer of 2020.

In early 2021 Clayton teamed up with veteran writer/producer, and co-founder of the band One Republic, Tim Myers, on a solo album also set for release with Position Music.

Current members
Clayton Stroope - Lead vocals
Scott Jason - Songwriter, Piano, Keys
Drew Cribley - Guitar
Bret Cohune - Bass guitar
Paul Niedermier - Drums

Discography

Studio albums

EPs 
Thriving Ivory EP (2003)
Secret Life EP (2004)
Rhapsody Originals EP (2008)
Tell Me Your Name EP(2009)

Singles

Music videos

References

External links
Soundcheck: Risers - THRIVING IVORY - Presented by AXE
Thriving Ivory is Hotel Indigo's Summer Artist in the Spotlight

Musical groups from the San Francisco Bay Area
Musical groups established in 2002
Wind-up Records artists
Musical quartets
American pop rock music groups
Alternative rock groups from California
2002 establishments in California